Wilderlands of the Magic Realm is a supplement for fantasy role-playing games published by Judges Guild in 1980. (JG 92)

Contents
Wilderlands of the Magic Realm is a campaign setting that describes the locations on four large wilderness maps (Wilderness Maps 11-14), mostly covering a sea dotted with over 300 islands.

The regions of Ghinor (#11), the Isles of the Blest (#12), the Ebony Coast (#13), and Ament Tundra (#14) are shown in full detail on the judge's maps and are roughly sketched out on the players' maps. The booklet describes and gives the location of many of the villages, castles, islands, ruins, relics, and monsters.

Publication history
Wilderlands of the Magic Realm was written by Mark Holmer with Bob Bledsaw, with a cover by Jennell Jaquays, and was published by Judges Guild in 1980 as a 48-page book and four large maps.

Reception

Notes

References

External links
 Judge's Guild Products by Title at acaeum.com.
 Wilderlands of the Magic Realm at acaeum.com.
 Wilderlands Campaign Maps at acaeum.com.
 City State Campaign - Judges Guild at waynesbooks.com.

Judges Guild fantasy role-playing game supplements
Role-playing game supplements introduced in 1980